Flap steak, or flap meat (IMPS/NAMP 1185A, UNECE 2203) is a  beef steak cut from the obliquus internus abdominis muscle of the bottom sirloin. It is generally very thin, fibrous and chewy, but flavorful, and often confused with both skirt steak and hanger steak.

Flap steak is popular in Mexican cuisine, where it is made into carne asada.  It is typically marinated in citrus juice and Mexican spices then grilled hot till charred on the outside, then diced or sliced thin and used in tacos, tortas, fajitas, and other dishes calling for thin beef steak.

It is also very common in France as bavette and other countries such as Brazil (fraldinha), Argentina and Uruguay. Usually mistranslated as flank steak.

Use
Flap meat is a thin, fibrous and chewy cut, that is marinated, cooked at high temperature to no more than rare and then cut thinly across the grain. In many areas flap steak is ground for hamburger or sausage meat, but in some parts of New England it is cut into serving-sized pieces (or smaller) and called  "steak tips."  It has seen increasing acceptance from some bistro owners serving steaks, as it is less expensive than other cuts, (tenderloin, shortloin, and ribeye in particular) and, if prepared correctly, is enjoyed by cost-conscious diners.

See also
 Flank steak
 Hanger steak
 Skirt steak

References

Cuts of beef